The Order of Civil Merit was an Order of Merit of the Kingdom of Bulgaria. Established in 1891, it had six classes.

History 
The Bulgarian Order of Cvil Merit was established on either 2nd or the 14th August 1891 by then Prince Ferdinand, and was founded with six classes and a Grand Cross grade. The order lasted until formerly dissolved by the Communist government of Bulgaria in 1946. The order has been revived by the current Republic of Bulgaria and is awarded today.

Grades of the Order 

 Grand Cross
 I Class – Great Cross
 II Class – Grand Officers cross
 III Class – Commanders cross
 IV Class – Officers cross
 V Class – Knights cross
 VI Class – Silver Cross

Insignia and design 
The Orders design was made up of a white-enamelled urdy cross, with a central disc bearing the royal monogram of Ferdinand I. The obverse disc is surrounded by a circlet with the inscription за Гражданско заслуги (For Civil Merit). On the reverse a lion turned to the right with the coat of arms of the princely house on it and the inscription 2. Август · 1891 (2 August 1891). Between the arms of the cross were placed green-enamelled oak leaves and branches, sometimes only enamelled on one side. Before 1908 the cross hung from a princely crown, but after Ferdinand was proclaimed Tsar in 1908 the cross was changed to the imperial Tsar's crown. This continued until 1946 and the abolition of the monarchy, where briefly the cross hung from an un-enamelled wreath until finally being dissolved by the communists in 1946. The Grand Cross and first class of the order consisted of the badge suspended from a sash with a star. The most obvious way to distinguish between the Grand Cross and the 1st Class is the sash. The sash of the Grand Cross includes a large rosette more commonly seen in other grand crosses, while the 1st class sash is simply tied around the badge placement in a less extravagant design. Apart from the sash the breast star of the Grand Cross is made up of gold and silver rays, while the first class is only in silver, though the shape, and size of the stars are identical. The Grand Officer's class consisted of the same badge, but suspended from a neck ribbon, while the star was smaller and also slightly different in design, taking on more of a diamond shape. The Commander was simply suspended from the neck like the Grand Officer, while the Officers and Knights crosses were suspended on a trifold ribbon and worn on the breast. The grades were distinguished by the addition of a rosette on the Officers cross ribbon. From 1908, the first three classes could also be presented with diamonds for exceptional merits.

Recipients 

 Arthur Zimmerman (1912)
 Pierce Charles de Lacy O'Mahony (1915)
 Kurt Klaudy (1938)
 Herman Senkowsky (1941)
 August Beckman
 Konrad zu Hohenlohe-Schillingsfürst 
 Johann Strauss (son)
 Viktor Urbanchich
 Ferdinand I of Bulgaria
 Boris III of Bulgaria
 Simeon II of Bulgaria

Gallery

The Republic Order
The Order was revived by the current Republic of Bulgaria. However today it is only awarded to Bulgarian citizens. In addition the Order now is only made up of the Officer and Commander grades, and the reverse and obverse of the modern order are switched around. What was the reverse on the Kingdom order is now the obverse and depicts the Bulgarian lion, however without the Saxon shield. The new reverse no longer depicts the royal monogram of Ferdinand I, and instead a rotated tricolour of the Bulgarian flag. While the exact shading has differed dramatically, the ribbon has remained mostly unchanged, interestingly as has also the crown suspension.

References

Orders, decorations, and medals of Bulgaria